The Denali Star is a passenger and semi-luxury train operated by the Alaska Railroad between the cities of Anchorage and Fairbanks Alaska. It is a seasonal train, only operating between the months of May and September. The Aurora Winter Train operates along the similar route during the rest of the year at a less frequent weekend schedule. The train is ridden by many tourists visiting the Denali National Park. The train consists of single level coaches and dome cars.

In 2020, summer services began in July in response to the COVID-19 pandemic.

Stations
The Denali Star stops only at the following stations:

Anchorage
Wasilla
Talkeetna
Denali
Fairbanks

References

External links
Alaska Railroad (official site)

Passenger trains of the Alaska Railroad
Passenger rail transportation in Alaska